Mick Rogers  may refer to:

 Mick Rogers (wildlife warden) (1944–2003), warden of Portland Bird Observatory and Field Centre at Portland Bill, Dorset, England
 Mick Rogers (musician) (born 1946), English rock guitarist, singer and songwriter
 Michael Rogers (cyclist) (born 1979), Australian road racing cyclist

See also
 Michael Rogers (disambiguation)